ZiNG Pop Culture is an Australian Pop Culture retailer. The company is headquartered in Eagle Farm, Queensland (a suburb of Brisbane) and operates over 100 stores across Australia as well as running the e-commerce website ZiNG Marketplace. ZiNG Pop Culture is a division of  EB Games Australia and GameStop.

History 
The first ZiNG Pop Culture store was opened in July 2014 at the Indooroopilly Shopping Centre in Indooroopilly, Queensland.

ZiNG Marketplace
ZiNG Marketplace was an Australian e-commerce retro gaming and pop culture marketplace operated by EB Games Australia and Zing Pop Culture. The marketplace facilitated consumer-to-consumer sales through its website. The website launched in September 2021, and was discontinued on 22 March 2022.

EB World
EB World is a loyalty program founded in 2011 and operated by parent company EB Games Australia. The program offers five reward levels. Level one, two, three and four can be earned by collecting points called "carrots" when shopping at EB Games and Zing Pop Culture stores. The level five tier is by invitation only with memberships being reviewed annually. The program allows receipt free shopping, longer preorder holds and other additional benefits through continued purchases. As of 2017 the program had over 5 million members.

References

Retail companies of Australia
Retail companies established in 2014
Australian companies established in 2014
2014 establishments in Australia
Companies based in Brisbane
GameStop
Australian subsidiaries of foreign companies